Graphephorum is a genus of North American plants in the grass family.

 Species
 Graphephorum melicoides  (Michx.) Desv. - Ontario, Québec, New Brunswick, Nova Scotia, Newfoundland, Maine, New Hampshire, Vermont, New York, Michigan, Wisconsin
 Graphephorum wolfii (Vasey) Coult. - British Columbia, Alberta, Saskatchewan south to California and New Mexico

 formerly included
see Arctophila Dupontia Hyalopoa Molinia Muhlenbergia Peyritschia Poa Scolochloa Sphenopholis Trisetum

References 

Pooideae
Poaceae genera
Flora of North America